Judge Dredd is a four-player pinball game produced by Bally Manufacturing in 1993, based on the British comic strip Judge Dredd in 2000 AD. Nearly 7,000 were made.

An eight-page full colour promotional comic was released by Bally and Egmont in 1993, which reprinted the story Pinboing Wizard from the Judge Dredd Annual 1981, written by Judge Dredd creator John Wagner and illustrated by Mike McMahon.

Gameplay
There are 2 types of games to choose from in Judge Dredd. Regulation game for 1 Credit, or Super Game for 2 Credits. In Regulation, the player must resolve the 9 crimes/issues.
Bad Impersonator 
Battle Tank
Blackout 
Pursuit
Meltdown 
Sniper Tower 
Stakeout 
Safe Cracker 
Manhunt Millions

Completing these 9 modes will result the player entering the Ultimate Challenge, Being congratulated by Judge Death, Ultimate Challenge features all the normal Crime Scenes and modes to be twice the amount. In Super Game, a fictional host named Anita Mann will dispatch you to one of 4 Crime scenes, Mad Bomber, Deadworld Attack, Traffic Jam, and Prison Break. Super Game uses 2 Balls and a Drain Shield with an Extended amount of time. Judge Dredd utilizes a 100,000,000 point super shot, this shot can only be achieved in Super Game. To do so, you must advance the crime level from Warning, to Class X Felony. You will have 3 Seconds to make the shot, if you make the shot, 100,000,000 points will be scored. Classic modes are found in Super Game but are doubled the value and marketed as Super.

To activate Multiball, shoot the drop targets to spell JUDGE. The planet Deadworld will begin spinning, and you must shoot the ball up the left ramp to lock a ball. If 3 balls are locked, they will be dropped onto the playfield and 3 extra balls will be ejected onto the playfield. This will result in Multiball. Players are greeted by Judge Death on the Dot Matrix display. You will be able to collect the Jackpot, collecting 4 Jackpots will result in Judge Death notifying you have entered the Ultimate Challenge.

Shoot the 5 JUDGE drop targets, Shoot the ball into the Subway tunnel, and begin the 6 ball Super Multiball. You will also have a chance to collect the Super Jackpot.

Later releases
In prototype builds, Judge Dredd pinball was intended to lock the balls in the atmosphere of Deadworld, but there were issues so that the ball would be locked, picked up by the crane, and be dropped back onto the playfield. The code to drive this lock feature was removed in later game versions, along with the physical lock mechanism itself.

Design Team
 Direction: Pat Lawlor
 Concept: Ed Krynski
 Game Design: John Trudeau
 Software: Jeff Johnson
 Mechanics: Ed Krynski
 Artwork: Kevin O'Connor
 Animation: Eugene Geer, Scott Slomiany
 Sound and Music: Paul Heitsch, Vince Pontarelli
 Callouts: Tim Kitzrow

Game quotes
 "Your driving days are over, punk!"
 "You cannot kill what is not alive..."
 "Get the extra ball"
 "Stop, or I will shoot!"
 "I have returned to judge this city!"
 "35 years for arms dealing!"
 "85 years for treason!"

Digital version
Judge Dredd pinball was released as enhanced digital version for DOS and Microsoft Windows in 1998, but differs significantly in both gameplay/rules as well as its presentation (e.g. sound and graphics).

Judge Dredd was available as a licensed table of The Pinball Arcade for PC, PlayStation 3, PlayStation 4, Android and iOS from January 2016 to June 30, 2018. After this date, this table is no longer possible to buy due to WMS license expiration.

References

External links

Pinpedia entry for Judge Dredd
Judge Dredd at Pinballrebel.com (with photographs of the game)

1993 pinball machines
Android (operating system) games
Bally pinball machines
DOS games
Pinball
Pinball machines based on comics
Pinball video games
Video games developed in the United Kingdom
Windows games